"You Gotta Love That" is a song written by Jess Brown and Brett Jones, and recorded by American country music artist Neal McCoy.  It was released in January 1996 as the fourth single from his album You Gotta Love That.  The song reached number 3 on the Billboard Hot Country Singles & Tracks chart in April 1996.

Chart performance
"You Gotta Love That" debuted at number 64 on the U.S. Billboard Hot Country Singles & Tracks for the week of January 6, 1996.

Year-end charts

References

1996 singles
Neal McCoy songs
Song recordings produced by Barry Beckett
Atlantic Records singles
1995 songs
Songs written by Jess Brown
Songs written by Brett Jones (songwriter)